Daphne depauperata is a shrub, of the family Thymelaeaceae.  It is evergreen, and is found in China, specifically western Yunnan.

Description
The shrub grows up to a height of 1.5 m.  It grows white flowers in groups of 2 to 5, and red fruit.  It grows up to an altitude of 2000 to 3200 m.

References

depauperata